Thovalai taluk is a taluk of Kanyakumari district of the Indian state of Tamil Nadu. The headquarters of the taluk is the town of Boothapandi.

Demographics
According to the 2011 census, the taluk of Thovala had a population of 121,049 with 60,091 males and 60,958 females. There were 1,014 women for every 1,000 men. The taluk had a literacy rate of 82.45%. Child population in the age group below 6 years were 5,379 Males and 5,032 Females.

Thidal (திடல்)
Thidal (Theradu / Kezhathidal / Kezhatheradu) is one of the smallest villages in Thovali Taluk of Kanyakumari District, Tamil Nadu. The nearest village is Rethinapuram. The village is covered by mountains in its all the four sides. Kadukarai is located to its west.

Villages
Thovalai village is famous for its flower garden and flower market. Flowers are exported to adjacent cities and Kerala state from here. Also it is a shooting spot for Tamil movies. Aralvaimozhy is famous for the wind electric production. It is the South Asia's biggest site for wind energy. Tamil is the main language spoken. Most of the area is covered by mountains and the south tip of the western ghats ends here. The list of villages are below:
	 Ananthapuram
	 Aralvoimozhy 
	 Arumanalloor 
	 Ashamboo 
	 Azhakiapandiapuram 
	 Beemanagari-Vp 
	 Buthapandi 
	 Erachakulam-Vp 
	 Esanthimangalam-Vp 
	 Gnalam-Vp 
	 Kadukkarai-Vp 
	 Kattupudur-Vp 
	 Mahendragiri 
	 Mathavalayam 
	 Poigaimalai 
	 Sahaya Nagar 
	 Chenbagaramanpudur 
	 Thadaga Malai 
	 Thadikkarankonam-Vp 
	 Thazhakudi 
	 Thekkumalai (East) 
	 Thekkumalai (West) 
	 Thellanthi -Vp 
	 Therisanamcoppu-Vp 
        Thittuvilai
	 Thidal (Ananthapuram) 
	 Thidal (Ananthapuram, Hariharaputrar Estate) 
	 Thidal (Ananthapuram, Sengamal Estate) 
	 Thiruppathisaram-Vp 
	 Thovalai 
	 Veerapuli

References 

Taluks of Kanyakumari district